Lou Pardini (born June 5, 1952) is an American Grammy-nominated keyboardist, songwriter and vocalist who is now best known as a former member of the rock band Chicago. He is known for his work with notable musicians such as Stevie Wonder, Santana, Elton John, Peabo Bryson, Earth, Wind, & Fire and The Doobie Brothers, and he has written hit songs for Patti Austin, Kenny G, The Temptations, and more.

Current career
Lou sang his popular song “I’m Gonna Wait For Your Love” duet with Saxophonist Eric Marienthal’s 1989 album was released by Verve Music (Formerly GRP Records) in 1989, and also the single because mostly worldwide including the Philippines.
His Grammy-nominated song "Just to See Her", recorded by Smokey Robinson, also won Robinson his first ever Grammy for the Best Male R&B Vocal performance.  The song "What Might Have Been" recorded by Pardini on his solo album titled Live and Let Live has also been a popular favorite in Asia, particularly in the Philippines and Japan, and also in Europe.

As a composer and artist, Pardini's credits include a library of music featured on TV and film such as Romance and Cigarettes, written and directed by John Turturro and starring Kate Winslet and James Gandolfini, and the movie Blue, directed by Ryan Minningham.

In August 2009, Pardini answered Bill Champlin's departure as keyboardist and vocalist in the multi-platinum band, Chicago.

On January 21, 2022 he announced his departure from Chicago in a Facebook group post.

References 

Living people
21st-century American keyboardists
Chicago (band) members
American male songwriters
Place of birth missing (living people)
1952 births
Koinonia (band) members
American people of Italian descent